The 2015 World RX of Portugal was the first round of the second season of the FIA World Rallycross Championship. The event was held at the Pista Automovel de Montalegre in Montalegre, close to the Spanish border.

Heats

Semi-finals

Semi-final 1

Semi-final 2

Final

Championship standings after the event

References

External links

|- style="text-align:center"
|width="35%"|Previous race:2014 World RX of Argentina
|width="30%"|FIA World Rallycross Championship2015 season
|width="35%"|Next race:2015 World RX of Hockenheim
|- style="text-align:center"
|width="35%"|Previous race:2014 World RX of Portugal
|width="30%"|World RX of Portugal
|width="35%"|Next race:2016 World RX of Portugal
|- style="text-align:center"

Portugal
World RX